Malaysia competed in the 1994 Commonwealth Games held in Victoria, British Columbia, Canada from 18 to 28 August 1994.

Medal summary

Medals by sport

Medallists

Athletics

Men
Track events

Field events

Women
Track events

Key
Note–Ranks given for track events are within the athlete's heat only
Q = Qualified for the next round
q = Qualified for the next round as a fastest loser or, in field events, by position without achieving the qualifying target
NR = National record
N/A = Round not applicable for the event
Bye = Athlete not required to compete in round

Badminton

Boxing

Men

Cycling

Road

Track
Points race

Scratch race

Gymnastics

Artistic
Women

Rhythmic

Lawn bowls

Four bowlers represented for Malaysia in lawn bowls.

Shooting

Men

Women

Weightlifting

Men

References

1994 in Malaysian sport
Malaysia at the Commonwealth Games
Nations at the 1994 Commonwealth Games